Otto's Pub & Brewery is a brewpub in State College, Pennsylvania, USA.  It first opened in 2002 and has been at its current location since 2010.  It is located approximately three miles from the main campus of the Pennsylvania State University, at 2235 North Atherton Street.

History

Otto's was opened in October 2002 by Charlie Schnable, previously the brewmaster of Williamsport's Bullfrog Brewery, and Derek Duffee, roommates when they were undergraduates at Penn State. Schnable managed the microbrewery operations, while Duffee handled all the restaurant operations. Duffee eventually sold his portion of Otto's.

In 2005, Roger Garthwaite became a partner in the business.  In November 2010, Otto's Pub and Brewery moved down the street to 2235 N. Atherton Street, a block away from its former location.  The new space, previously a Quaker Steak & Lube restaurant, provided additional parking, more seating and a larger brewery.  The new location also provided space for a full bar.

Many of Otto's beers are named after local Central Pennsylvania attractions, or are references to fly-fishing: Spruce Creek Lager, Spring Creek Lager, Red Mo Ale, Black Mo Stout, Slab Cabin IPA, Zeno's Rye Ale, Mt. Nittany Pale Ale, and Green Weenie IPA and Green Drake IPA. Otto's has long included a Root Beer soft drink in addition to the microbrew selection; they've also added Orange Soda, Grape Soda and Ginger Beer.

Otto's Pub and Brewery and Barrel 21 Distillery and Dining are owned by C&D Brewing Ventures.

References

Bibliography
Bryson, Lew. Pennsylvania Breweries. 3rd Edition. Stackpole Books, 2005.

External links
Official website

Beer brewing companies based in Pennsylvania
State College, Pennsylvania
Buildings and structures in Centre County, Pennsylvania
Tourist attractions in Centre County, Pennsylvania